The Japanese Garden in Micke Grove Regional Park is a 3-acre Japanese garden in Lodi, California, the brainchild of "Duke" Yoshimura, a Japanese-American. It was created in 1959 and designed by the landscape architect Nagao Sakurai. It was opened in 1965.

The garden includes fish ponds with stepping stones and Koi fish, and a five-story pagoda lantern donated to the park by Lodi’s sister city, Kofu, Japan.

Gallery

References

 Micke Grove Regional Park: Japanese Garden

Lodi, California
Japanese gardens in California
Parks in San Joaquin County, California